The Nordic Media Festival is the largest media conference in the Nordic region.

Held annually in Bergen, Norway, the Festival features 100 speakers, and around 1,860 delegates attend, representing the full spectrum of the industry. Founded in 1988, the festival is a non-profit foundation. In addition to the conference and unique networking events, a variety of projects are organized for high-school students: NMD Ung gives youth an opportunity to increase their competence and gain access to the media industry. The festival culminates in the Gullruten Award Show, the Norwegian equivalent of the Emmy Awards.

Previous speakers 
Some of the previous speakers at the conference:
 Adam B. Ellick, Senior Video Correspondent, The New York Times
 Brad Berens, Advisor and Principal at Big Digital Idea Consulting
 Gunilla Herlitz, CEO Bonnier News, Dagens Nyheter, Dagens Industri and Expressen
 Tim Pool, Director of Media Innovation Fusion
 Louise Roug, Global News Editor, Mashable
 Alan Sepinwall, Writer and TV critic
 Lola Landekic and Will Perkins, Editors of Art of the Title
 Dana Chivvis, producer of 'Serial Dee Forbes, President and Managing Director of Discovery Networks Western Europe
 Chad Oakes and Michael Frislev, producers of Fargo Kelly Merryman, Vice President of Content Acquisition, Netflix
 Ilene Landress, Executive Producer of Girls Maria and Andre Jacquemetton, Writers and Executive Producers, Mad Men Claudia Weinstein, Story Editor, 60 Minutes Simon Sutton, President, HBO International and Content Distribution
 Gareth Neame, Executive Producer, Downton Abbey Rory Albanese, Writer and Executive Producer, The Daily Show Piv Bernth, Executive Producer of the Danish TV series The Killing and The Bridge Jeff Jarvis, Blogger and author
 Louis Theroux, Documentarist
 Matt Stone and Trey Parker, Creators of South Park Elisabeth Murdoch, CEO, Shine
 Jeffrey Cole, Director, Center for the Digital Future, Annenberg
 Lord Michael Dobbs, Executive Producer and author House of Cards Adam Price, creator of Borgen Clay Shirky, Author and Internet evangelist
 Aron Pilhofer, Editor Interactive News, New York Times Robert G. Picard, Director of Research, Reuters Institute for the Study of Journalism
 Raju Narisetti, SVP and Deputy Head of Strategy at News Corp.
 Meredith Bennett & Opus Moreschi, Executive Producer and Head Writer, The Colbert Report Professor Hans Rosling, TEDtalk favorite
 Sagar Savla, Computer Science researcher and Product executive, Google
 Peter Lord, Creative Director and Co-owner of Aardman Animations
 Alan Rusbridger, Editor, The Guardian Steve Rasch, Picture Editor for Curb Your Enthusiasm Tristan Davies, Executive Editor, The Sunday Times Brian Seth Hurst, CEO, The Opportunity Management Group
 Betsy Hubbard & Debra Jasper, Mindset Digital
 Brian Storm, CEO, MediaStorm
 Jonathan Spencer, Creative Director, BBC News
 Baratunde Thurston, Writer and Director of Digital, The Onion Mario García, Designer, Garcia Media
 Keri Lewis Brown, Managing Director, K7 Media
 Photographer Todd Stanley and Deck boss Edgar Hansen, Deadliest Catch Juan Antonio Giner, President, Innovation International Media Consulting Group
 Magnús Scheving aka "Sportacus", LazyTown Entertainment
 Lucy Bowden, Executive Producer, Dragonfly Film & TV Productions Ltd.
 Linda Green, Head of BBC's Creative Leadership Programme, BBC Academy
 Nakhle El Hage, Director of News and Current Affairs, Al Arabiya News Channel
 Sven Martin, Visual Effects Supervisor, Pixomondo, (Game of Thrones)
 Tom McDonnell, Commercial Director, Monterosa
 Matthew McGregor, Associate VP for Strategy & Political Director, Blue State Digital
 Kevin Mundye, Consultant Executive Producer, Shine Global
 Mariana Santos, Digital Media & Graphic Designer, The Guardian Sam Tomlinson, Director, PwC
 Matt Locke, Director, Storythings
 Liv Ullmann, Actor and Director
 Evgeny Morozov, Writer
 Alexa Fogel, Casting Director, The Wire Tim Plyming, Project Executive, Digital & Editor Live Sites, BBC's London 2012 Olympic Team
 Justin Scroggie, Format Doctor, The Format People Group
 Joeri van den Bergh, Co-Founder, Insites Consulting
 Tyler Brûlé, publisher, Wallpaper and Monocle Peter Barron, Director of External Relations, Google
 Sarah Cohen, Pulitzer Winner and Knight Professor, Duke University
 Donal McIntyre, Undercover Journalist, DareFilms
 Russell Viers, Coach, Russelviers.com
 Mani, Photojournalist, France / Syria
 Vikram Gandhi, Director, Kumaré, Disposable TV
 Gerd Leonhard, CEO, The Futures Agency
 Lina Ben Mhenni, Blogger, A Tunisian Girl Claire O'Connor, Director, Discovery Networks, EMEA Insights & Innovation
 Andy Dickinson, Senior Lecturer, University of Central Lancashire
 Christopher Sopher, Student, University of North Carolina
 Michael Bull, Professor, University of Sussex
 Sami Sockol, Freelancer, The Washington Post Andrew DeVigal, Director of Multimedia, The New York Times Richard McKerrow, Creative Director, Love Productions
 Amanda Cox, Graphic Designer, The New York Times Tim Crescenti, President, Small World
 John Ellis, Professor, Royal Holloway College
 Rob Evans, Journalist, The Guardian Jonathan Marks, Director, Critical Distance BV
 Yvonne Ridley, Journalist, Press TV
 Julia Dimambro, Managing Director EMEA/APAC, Cherry Media Holdings
 Bob Drogin, Pulitzer Winner and Staff Writer, The Los Angeles Times Javier Errea, Designer, Errea Communication
 Adrian Holovaty, Founder, Everyblock.com
 Andrew Keen, Writer, "Cult of the Amateur: How today's Internet is killing our culture"
 Christina Lamb, Correspondent and Author, "Small Wars Permitting"
 Peter McEvoy, Executive Producer and Supervisor EP Factual, ABC Television
 Virginia Mouseler, Chief Executive Officer, The WIT Aye Chan Naing, Director, Democratic Voice of Burma
 Deborah Scranton, Journalist and Filmmaker, The War Tapes, Clover & a Bee Films
 Jürgen Scheible, Artist & Scientist, Media Lab, University of Art and Design, Helsinki
 Ben Hammersley, Journalist, The Guardian''
 Johnny Keeling, Producer, BBC
 John Lynch, Head of Science and History, BBC
 Irshad Manji, Journalist and Writer, Refusenik
 Angie Mason, Producer, Films of Record Ltd.
 Richard Porter, Head of News, BBC World News
 Ben Frow, Controller of Feature and Entertainment, Channel Five
 Joel Mishcon, Director and Producer, Chrome Productions
 Maher Othman, Editor of Politics, Al hayat TV
 William Uricchio, Professor, Massachusetts Institute of Technology

References

International conferences
Annual events in Norway
1988 establishments in Norway
Recurring events established in 1988